Novoivanovka is a rural locality (a selo) and the administrative center of Novoivanovsky Selsoviet of Svobodnensky District, Amur Oblast, Russia. The population is 516 as of 2018.

Geography 
The village is located 12 km west from Svobodny.

References 

Rural localities in Svobodnensky District